Tim Spencer or Timothy Spencer may refer to:

 Tim Spencer (American football) (born 1960),  American football running back 
 Tim Spencer (figure skater) (born 1943), Australian figure skater
 Tim Spencer (singer) (1908–1974), American singer and actor
 Timothy Spencer (Coronation Street), a character from the British soap opera Coronation Street
 Timothy Wilson Spencer (1962–1994), American serial killer